Armide is the French and English form of the name Armida, a sorceress in Tasso's Gerusalemme liberata, after whom are also named:
Armide (Lully), an opera by Jean-Baptiste Lully
Armide (Gluck), an opera by Christoph Willibald Gluck
Le Pavillon d'Armide, ballet by Fokine
, a submarine constructed during World War I
Armide (ship), a French frigate
Armide-class frigate

See also Armida#In_opera